"Unwritten" is a song by English singer Natasha Bedingfield for her debut studio album of the same name. It was released in 2004 as the third single from the album. The song was written by Bedingfield, Danielle Brisebois, and Wayne Rodrigues and produced by Rodrigues and Brisebois. The single was released as the album's third UK single and second US single (in September 2005). In 2006, "Unwritten" became the theme song for the MTV reality television series The Hills. It reached number five on the Billboard Hot 100, becoming her first top-ten hit in the United States.

Background
"Unwritten" was the most played song on US radio during 2006 as confirmed before her performance at the Concert for Diana, and as of March 2006, was certified platinum in the U.S. The song is Bedingfield's most successful single in the US, along with "Pocketful of Sunshine"; both songs peaked at number five on the Billboard Hot 100. The song earned Bedingfield a Grammy nomination in Grammy Award for Best Female Pop Vocal Performance at the 49th Grammy Awards and she was also included in the Grammy Nominees album of that year. She lost that nomination to Christina Aguilera's "Ain't No Other Man".

Commercial performance
"Unwritten" peaked at number five for two weeks on the Hot 100 and stayed in the chart for 38 weeks, thirteen of those inside the top ten, eventually appearing at number six on the 2006 Hot 100-year-end chart. Estimated sales in the United States for "Unwritten" are 2,731,000 as of June 2011. This was the third highest ranking for a female artist for 2006 behind "Hips Don't Lie" by Shakira and Wyclef Jean, and "Promiscuous" by Nelly Furtado and Timbaland.

The song also proved to be very popular in other radio formats in the United States. The Johnny Vicious and Hani Club Mixes peaked at number one on the Dance Club Play and number two on the Dance Radio Airplay chart, while the original version went to number two on the Adult Top 40 and spent ten weeks at number one on the Adult Contemporary chart. "Unwritten" was not as successful in the United Kingdom as her previous chart-topping hit "These Words", but made an impressive showing on the charts, peaking at number six. It is one of her few singles to peak higher in the US than in the UK.

Music videos
Two different music videos were made to promote the song: one was shot in 2004 in the UK for international release; the other one was shot in New York in 2005 for release in North America. Both versions received airplay in Latin America.

Original version
The original version of the video, directed by Michael Gracey, shows Bedingfield as the cover of a small animated book in a large library as it climbs an amazingly large bookshelf. As it gets higher the shelf becomes more like a cliff, even snowing at the top. At the top the book sees a dove and falls off. As the small book is torn apart in the fall, people pick up the pages and look up into the sky. The video may be seen to elaborate the lyric as an oblique spiritual narrative of striving to ascend (and reach a heavenly dove), while the lyric also reflects Bedingfield's concerns at this time with the process of writing, concerns perhaps more clearly expressed in "These Words", also featured on the "Unwritten" album.

North American version
The North American version, directed by Chris Applebaum, shows Bedingfield in an elevator. As the elevator stops at each floor, she experiences different things, including running into a park from the elevator where she sings to the camera as the sun shines brightly behind her, comforting a crying woman who kisses the wall of the elevator with red lipstick before she leaves, dancing on a street with a group of children as they are sprayed by water, watching a janitor throw away his money and watches, singing with a church choir, standing next to a couple kissing madly, and finding a potential romance with a man (portrayed by Keith Carhill) who enters the elevator and follows her after she exits. According to a TRL interview, Bedingfield chose to make the scene where she gets wet because while filming the North American version of her "These Words" video it was a very hot and sunny day in Rio de Janeiro. This scene occurs during the second chorus.

Legacy
Bedingfield performed the song at the Concert for Diana. Bedingfield performed this, alongside "Pocketful of Sunshine" in the season 7 finale of the Canadian series Degrassi: The Next Generation. It is the theme song to the popular MTV series, The Hills. Bedingfield later re-recorded another, slower version of "Unwritten" with production team Carney for use in the final episode of The Hills. A 2019 remix version appears as the theme song in The Hills sequel series, The Hills: New Beginnings. "Unwritten" has heard in the following feature films: Ice Princess, Because I Said So and The Sisterhood of the Traveling Pants. 2006 World Champion figure skater Kimmie Meissner has done several exhibition programs to the song as well. 
The song is heard on the series premiere of Ugly Betty. 

It is featured on the episode "Welcome to the Dollhouse", from the series Pretty Little Liars. In 2006, the Bratz released a cover of the song on a special edition of their soundtrack album, Bratz: Forever Diamondz.
The song appears in the video games Karaoke Revolution Presents: American Idol Thrillville: Off the Rails and as downloadable content for Rock Band 4, while the Johnny Vicious remix appears in Dance Dance Revolution SuperNova 2 alongside its original video. The song was used for the Pantene television and radio advertisements. "Unwritten" has become a common song used to celebrate graduation due to its uplifting message about the future.

Track listings
These are the formats and track listings of major single releases of "Unwritten".

UK 2-track CD
(Released 29 November 2004)
 "Unwritten" (album version)
 "Wild Horses" (live in Sydney)

UK maxi CD
(Released 29 November 2004)
 "Unwritten" (album version)
 "The Scientist" (live at BBC Radio One Live Lounge)
 "If You're Gonna Jump" (Paul Oakenfold Remix 7" Remix)
 "Unwritten" (video)

International single
(Released 7 February 2005)
 "Unwritten" (radio edit)
 "The Scientist" (live at BBC Radio One Live Lounge)
 "If You're Gonna Jump" (Paul Oakenfold Remix 7" Remix)
 "Unwritten" (album version)
 "Unwritten" (video)

US single CD
(Released 23 October 2007)
 "Unwritten" (album version)
 "Unwritten" (Johnny Vicious Club Mix)
 "Wild Horses" (live at the Nokia Theatre, New York)
 "Unwritten" (ringtone)

Remixes/Official versions
"Unwritten" (Johnny Vicious Club)
"Unwritten" (Johnny Vicious Radio)
"Unwritten" (Johnny Vicious Warehouse)
"Unwritten" (Johnny Vicious Mixshow Edit)
"Unwritten" (Hani Num Club)
"Unwritten" (Hani Num Radio)
"Unwritten" (Hani Num Dub)
"Unwritten" (Special live acoustic performance for The N)
"Unwritten" (Ultimix Pt.1)
"Unwritten" (Ultimix Pt.2)

2019 Remix Digital Single

 "Unwritten (The 2019 Remix)

Charts

Weekly charts

Year-end charts

All-time charts

Certifications

!scope="col" colspan="3"| Ringtone
|-

Release history

See also
 List of number-one dance singles of 2006 (U.S.)
 List of Billboard Adult Contemporary number ones of 2006 and 2007 (U.S.)

References

2004 singles
2004 songs
2005 singles
Epic Records singles
The Hills (TV series)
Music videos directed by Chris Applebaum
Natasha Bedingfield songs
Number-one singles in the Czech Republic
Phonogenic Records singles
Songs written by Danielle Brisebois
Songs written by Natasha Bedingfield
Television drama theme songs